A solar tube may refer to:
Evacuated tube collector – a type of high efficiency solar thermal collector
Light tube